Lake Hiawatha is an unincorporated community located within Parsippany-Troy Hills in Morris County, New Jersey, United States. The area is served as United States Postal Service as ZIP code 07034. As of the 2010 United States Census, the population for ZIP Code Tabulation Area 07034 was 9,360.

Lake Hiawatha was named after Hiawatha, a 16th-century First Nations leader and peacemaker, as evident by plaques on the gazebo on Beverwyck Road, the name of its park, and in the name and emblem of its fire department. However, its name was likely inspired by the popularity of The Song of Hiawatha, an 1855 poem by Longfellow which has little to no correlation with the historical figure of Hiawatha.

Demographics

History

Pre-colonial history 
Lake Hiawatha is part of the Lenapehoking, the traditional territory of the Munsee subtribe of the Lenape tribe. Lenape tribes inhabited the lands for thousands of years prior to European arrival.

Beverwyck plantation 

Beverwyck Road is the central road that divides downtown Lake Hiawatha, containing the majority of its small businesses, and leads to Route 10.

The road was named for the 2,000-acre (3.125 mile) Beverwyck plantation, a slave plantation which was in operation from the 1730s to the early 1800s. The estate's owners included William Kelly, Abraham Lott, and Lucas Von Beverhoudt. It was also called Beaverwyck, Beaverwick, and the Red Barracks. 

In 1768, a newspaper advertisement for the property mentioned a "Negro House" which was constructed to house over 20 enslaved workers, including a blacksmith, a shoemaker, and a mason. In 1780, Von Beverhoudt posted a newspaper notice providing a description to re-capture "Jack," a "runaway slave"; this notice is on file at the Morristown National Historical Park.

Phebe Ann Jacobs (1785 - 1850) was "born a slave" on the Beverwyck plantation. As a child, she was "given to" Maria Malleville, the daughter of President Wheelock of Dartmouth college. In 1820, Maria Malleville married President Allen of Bowdoin College in Brunswick, Maine. Jacobs remained with the family until the death of Maria Allen, from which time she chose to live alone. For the last years of her life, she was free in Maine, laundering clothes for students of Bowdoin. Mrs. T. C. Upham, the wife of a theology professor at Bowdoin, met Jacobs and wrote the biography of her life. Jacobs died in Brunswick, February 28, 1850.

In 1850, Upham published the biography titled Narrative of Phebe Ann Jacobs in London. The book demonstrated Jacobs's lifelong devotion to Christianity. The biography served as inspiration for author Harriet Beecher Stowe as she wrote 1852 anti-slavery novel Uncle Tom's Cabin.

During the Revolutionary War from 1775 to 1783, Beverwyck Road was known as Washington's Trail, and was often traversed by French and Continental armies en route to Morristown.

Visitors entertained at the Beverwyck plantation include George Washington, Nathaniel Greene, and Marquis de Lafayette.

Addition of lake 
In the 1920s, developers began developing the community, focusing on summer houses.

By 1932, the built environment was complete and houses were settled. North Beverwyck Road, Dacotah Avenue and Nokomis Avenue were the only streets available.

The lake was completed in 1935. Developers redirected the Rockaway River into a lake and used the shoreline to construct summer houses and a meeting house for its country club. The lake was meant as the center of summer activity, consisting of an artificial beach with white sand, a pavilion, a playground, and an area for barbecues.

In January of 1935, a fire destroyed a home on Wenonah Ave in Lake Hiawatha. As a response, six men founded the volunteer-based Lake Hiawatha Fire Department in a basement. Their first meeting was held at the clubhouse in February. The town could only afford three backpacks of galvanized fire pumps (a.k.a., "Indian pumps"). The new Department's goal was to fundraise the purchase of more substantial firefighting equipment.

Several fundraisers were held in 1935. First, the Fire Department hosted a professional boxing match that cost 50¢ for general admission and 75¢ for ringside. 

In 1935, the firefighters organized and performed a minstrel show fundraiser, a type of stage performance based on racist Black caricatures. Circa 1935, minstrel shows were predominantly amateur theater, continuing to perform slavery-focused musical skits of the Antebellum era, circa 1850s. An audience of 414 attended the show; donations and ticket sales provided enough money for the purchase the first fire engine.

In August of 1935, the fire department purchased their first fire engine, a 1913 American LaFrance.

In 1948, Benjamin J. Kline donated the funds required to create the Lake Hiawatha Public Library.

By the 1960s, the lake had dried up and the cabins were rebuilt into year-round homes.

Geology

The area was created when a chain of volcanic islands collided with the North American plate. The islands went over the North American plate and created the highlands of New Jersey. Then around 450 million years ago, a small continent collided with proto North America and created folding and faulting in western New Jersey and the southern Appalachians.  When the African plate separated from North America, this created an aborted rift system or half-graben. The land lowered between the Ramapo fault in western Parsippany and the fault that was west of Paterson.

The Wisconsin Glacier covered the area from 21,000 to 13,000 BC.  When the glacier melted due to climate change, Lake Passaic was formed, covering all of what is now Lake Hiawatha. Lake Passaic slowly drained and much of the area is swamps or low-lying meadows such as Troy Meadows. The Rockaway River flows over the Ramapo fault in Boonton and then flows along the northwestern edge of Lake Hiawatha. In this area, there are swamps near the river or in the area.

Notable people
People who were born in, residents of, or otherwise closely associated with Lake Hiawatha include:

 Phebe Ann Jacobs (1785 - 1850), devout Congregationalist and free woman born on the Beverwyck plantation in Lake Hiawatha. Her biography inspired Harriet Beecher-Stowe's 1852 abolitionist novel Uncle Tom's Cabin.
 Hector A. Cafferata Jr. (1929 - 2016), United States Marine awarded the Medal of Honor for his service at the Battle of Chosin Reservoir during the Korean War.
 Bobby Darin (1936–1973), singer, who purchased a house in Lake Hiawatha with income from his 1959 rock and roll single "Dream Lover."
 Garrett Reisman (born 1968), physics professor, former NASA astronaut aboard the International Space Station, author, and former SpaceX executive; he spent a combined 107 days in space and performed three space walks.

References

Parsippany-Troy Hills, New Jersey
Unincorporated communities in Morris County, New Jersey
Unincorporated communities in New Jersey